Leidy  is a surname and given name. Notable people with the name include: 

surname
Joseph Leidy (1823–1891), American paleontologist
Paul Leidy (1813–1877), American politician

given name
Leidy Asprilla (1997–2019), Colombian footballer
Leidy Churchman (born 1979), American painter
Leidy Klotz, American engineer
Leidy Natalia Muñoz Ruiz (born 1985), Colombian racing cyclist